The Malta is a river of Latvia, 105 kilometres long. It discharges into the Rēzekne.

See also
List of rivers of Latvia

Rivers of Latvia